Grande River is the name of the following rivers:

 Grande River (Rio de Janeiro), Rio de Janeiro state, Brazil
 La Grande River, Quebec, Canada
 Grande River (Coquimbo), Chile
 Grande River (Panama)
 Grande River (Sabana Grande, Puerto Rico)
 Grande River (Uruguay)

See also
 Grande River Protected Zone, Costa Rica
 Grande Rivière (Ouelle River tributary), Quebec, Canada
 Grand River (disambiguation)
 Rio Grande (disambiguation)